The 2019–20 DHB-Pokal was the 44th edition of the tournament.

Format
The first round was split in a north and a south part and played in mini tournaments where only the winner advanced to the round of 16. From there on a knockout system was used to determine the winner. The final four was played on one weekend in Hamburg.

Round 1
The draw was held on 18 June 2019. The matches were played on 17 and 18 August 2019.

|-
|colspan=3 style="text-align:center;" |North
|-
|colspan=3 style="text-align:center;" |Played in Lübeck

|-
|colspan=3 style="text-align:center;" |Played in Habenhausen

|-
|colspan=3 style="text-align:center;" |Played in Burscheid

|-
|colspan=3 style="text-align:center;" |Played in Minden

|-
|colspan=3 style="text-align:center;" |Played in Nordhorn-Lingen

|-
|colspan=3 style="text-align:center;" |Played in Baunatal

|-
|colspan=3 style="text-align:center;" |Played in Northeim

|-
|colspan=3 style="text-align:center;" |Played in Spenge

|}

|-
|colspan=3 style="text-align:center;" |South
|-
|colspan=3 style="text-align:center;" |Played in Aue

|-
|colspan=3 style="text-align:center;" |Played in Balingen Weilstetten

|-
|colspan=3 style="text-align:center;" |Played in Pforzheim

|-
|colspan=3 style="text-align:center;" |Played in Rodgau-Nieder-Roden

|-
|colspan=3 style="text-align:center;" |Played in Saarlouis

|-
|colspan=3 style="text-align:center;" |Played in Aachen

|-
|colspan=3 style="text-align:center;" |Played in Göppingen

|-
|colspan=3 style="text-align:center;" |Played in Hanau

|}

Round of 16
The draw was held on 21 August 2019. The matches were played between 25 September and 3 October 2019.

Quarterfinals
The draw was held on 3 October 2019. The matches were played on 3 and 4 December 2019.

Final four
The draw was held on 9 December 2019. The matches would have been played on 4 and 5 April 2020. Due to the COVID-19 pandemic the league postponed the final four on 12 March 2020 and moved it back to after the season. On 4 May, the matches were scheduled to 27 and 28 February 2021 but was moved back later on. It took place on 3 and 4 June 2021.

Bracket

Semifinals

Final

References

External links
Official website

2020
DHB-Pokal